Charuka Tharindu (born 11 January 2001) is a Sri Lankan cricketer. He made his Twenty20 debut on 10 March 2021, for Chilaw Marians Cricket Club in the 2020–21 SLC Twenty20 Tournament. He made his List A debut on 24 March 2021, for Chilaw Marians Cricket in the 2020–21 Major Clubs Limited Over Tournament.

References

External links
 

2001 births
Living people
Sri Lankan cricketers
Chilaw Marians Cricket Club cricketers
Place of birth missing (living people)